Governor Wilson may refer to:

David Wilson, Baron Wilson of Tillyorn, 27th Governor of Hong Kong from 1987 to 1992
Emanuel Willis Wilson, 7th Governor of West Virginia
George A. Wilson, 28th Governor of Iowa
John Lyde Wilson, 49th Governor of South Carolina
John Wilson (British Army officer, died 1856), Acting Governor of British Ceylon from 1811 to 1812 and in 1831
Leslie Wilson (politician), Governor of Bombay from 1923 to 1926 and 15th Governor of Queensland from 1932 to 1946
Malcolm Wilson (governor), 50th Governor of New York
Pete Wilson, 36th Governor of California
Robert Wilson (British Army officer, born 1777), Governor of Gibraltar from 1842 to 1848
Roger B. Wilson, 52nd Governor of Missouri
Samuel Herbert Wilson, Governor of Trinidad and Tobago from 1921 to 1924 and Governor of Jamaica from 1924 to 1925
Stanley C. Wilson, 62nd Governor of Vermont
Woodrow Wilson, 34th Governor of New Jersey